The list below includes Roman women who were notable for their family connections, or their sons or husbands, or their own actions.  In the earlier periods, women came to the attention of (later) historians either as poisoners of their husbands (a very few cases), or as wives, daughters, and mothers of great men such as Scipio Africanus.  In later periods, women exercised or tried to exercise political power either through their husbands (as did Fulvia and Livia Drusilla) or political intrigues (as did Clodia and Servilia), or directly (as did Agrippina the younger and later Roman empresses). Even the Severan dynasty from the beginning to the end was completely dominated by four powerful and calculating women.

During the Roman Kingdom

During the Roman Republic
 Valeria, the name of the women of the Valeria gens
 Valeria, first priestess of Fortuna Muliebris in 488 BC
 Aemilia Tertia (с. 230 – 163 or 162 BC), wife of Scipio Africanus and mother of Cornelia (see below), noted for the unusual freedom given her by her husband, her enjoyment of luxuries, and her influence as role model for elite Roman women after the Second Punic War.  Her date of birth, marriage, and death are all unknown. Her husband's birth and death dates are also not known precisely, but approximated.
 Cornelia (с. 190s – c. 115 BC), virtually deified by Roman women as a model of feminine virtues and Stoicism, but never officially deified.  The first Roman woman, whose approximate birth year and whose year of death is known, thanks to a law she had passed to allow her granddaughter to inherit.
 Publilia (1st century BC), the name of a woman of the gens Publilius. She was killed in 154 BC for poisoning her husband, the consul of the preceding year.

During the Classical Roman Empire
 Agrippina the Elder (c. 14 BC – AD 33), wife of Germanicus, granddaughter of Augustus, mother of emperor Caligula and Agrippina the Younger (below)
 Agrippina the Younger (1st century), niece and wife of emperor Claudius, mother of emperor Nero; held up as a bad example.
 Aurelia (1st century BC), mother of Julius Caesar
 Antonia the Elder (1st century BC), grandmother of Emperor Nero
 Antonia Minor (1st century BC – 1st century AD), mother of Emperor Claudius and Germanicus, favorite niece of Augustus Caesar, considered a role model for women in the Roman Empire after she refused to remarry and spent the rest of her life raising her children and grandchildren.
 Atia, mother of Augustus and Octavia Minor
 Claudia Pulchra, wife of Publius Quinctilius Varus
 Claudia Marcella, nieces of Caesar Augustus
 Domitia Lepida the Elder, aunt of Emperor Nero
 Domitia Lepida the Younger, sister of the following, Mother of the Empress Valeria Messalina
 Domitia Longina, wife of Emperor Domitian
 Domitia Calvilla, mother of Emperor Marcus Aurelius
 Domitia Paulina, Aelia Domitia Paulina, Julia Serviana Paulina, female relatives of Emperor Hadrian
 Julia the Elder, daughter of Augustus
 Julia Livia (1st century), granddaughter of Emperor Tiberius
 Livia Drusilla (1st century BC), wife of Tiberius Claudius Nero, mother of the Emperor Tiberius, and then wife of Augustus Caesar.
 Livilla (1st century), granddaughter of Livia
 Valeria Messalina, Emperor Claudius' wife, notorious for her promiscuity.
 Octavia the Younger, sister of Caesar Augustus and fourth wife of Marcus Antonius (Mark Antony)
 Plautia Urgulanilla, Emperor Claudius' first wife
 Scribonia, second wife of Augustus and mother of his only legitimate child (whom she apparently ignored until her exile)
 Vipsania Agrippina, first wife of Tiberius and the only one he loved
 Vipsania Julia (19 BC – c. AD 29), granddaughter of Augustus
 Claudia Metrodora (1st century AD), Greco-Roman public benefactor, lived on Kos.
 Lucilla, (2nd century AD) Roman Empress, failed in her coup attempt on brother Commodus.
 Aquilia Severa (3rd century), Vestal Virgin and wife of Elagabalus.
 Clodia (1st century BC), possibly Catullus's Lesbia
 Domitia Decidiana, wife of Roman General Gnaeus Julius Agricola and mother-in-law to historian Tacitus.

See also
 Women in Ancient Rome
 List of Vestal Virgins

References

distinguished